The 1992–93 NBA season was the Nuggets' 17th season in the National Basketball Association and 26th season as a franchise. In the 1992 NBA draft, the Nuggets selected LaPhonso Ellis out of Notre Dame University with the fifth overall pick, and selected Bryant Stith from the University of Virginia with the thirteenth pick. During the off-season, the team acquired second-year guard Robert Pack from the Portland Trail Blazers, and brought back Dan Issel as their new head coach; Issel starred for the Nuggets for ten seasons as a player. Under Issel, the Nuggets got off to a 7–7 start, but then suffered a 14-game losing streak from December 5 to January 5. At midseason, the team signed free agent Tom Hammonds, who was previously released by the Charlotte Hornets. Despite the losing streak, the Nuggets showed significant improvement holding a 20–30 record at the All-Star break, and missed the playoffs by three games with a record of 36–46, fourth in the Midwest Division.

The progress of second-year star Dikembe Mutombo into one of the league's best defensive players was reason for hope, as he averaged 13.8 points, 13.0 rebounds and 3.5 blocks per game, while Chris Jackson led the team in scoring averaging 19.2 points per game, which resulted in him being named the Most Improved Player of the Year. In addition, Ellis averaged 14.7 points, 9.1 rebounds and 1.4 blocks per game, and was named to the NBA All-Rookie First Team, while Reggie Williams provided the team with 17.0 points, 5.4 rebounds and 1.6 steals per game, and Pack contributed 10.5 points and 4.4 assists per game off the bench. Stith contributed 8.9 points per game, but only played just 39 games due to a broken toe, and Marcus Liberty provided with 8.1 points and 4.3 rebounds per game.

Following the season, Jackson would change his name to Mahmoud Abdul-Rauf after converting to Islam two years ago. It was also the final season the Nuggets wore their "rainbow skyline" uniforms.

NBA Draft

Roster

Regular season

Season standings

y - clinched division title
x - clinched playoff spot

z - clinched division title
y - clinched division title
x - clinched playoff spot

Record vs. opponents

Player statistics

Regular season

Player Statistics Citation:

Awards, records, and honors
 Mahmoud Abdul-Rauf, NBA Most Improved Player Award
 LaPhonso Ellis, NBA All-Rookie Team 1st Team

References

Denver Nuggets seasons
1992 in sports in Colorado
1993 in sports in Colorado
Denver Nug